Savatheda Fynes (born October 17, 1974) is a track and field sprint athlete, competing internationally for Bahamas. She is an Olympic gold medalist in the 4 x 100 meter relay race.  Some sources spell her first name "Sevatheda."

Career

She graduated Physiology and Exercise Science at Michigan State University, East Lansing, Michigan, USA.
She missed the 2001 World Championships due to injury.  She had a minor car accident prior to the 2000 Olympic trials, which limited her training. At the World Championships in 1999 she was eliminated in semifinals due to an injured hip flexor. In 1996 a hamstring injury kept her out of the 100m at the Atlanta Games.

She was a member of the Bahamas 4x100m relay team that won gold at the 1999 World Championships. After that performance the team of Fynes, Pauline Davis-Thompson, Debbie Ferguson, Chandra Sturrup and Eldece Clark-Lewis were dubbed the Golden Girls. When they won the relay again at the Sydney Olympics they showed the world why they had earned that name.
The girls returned home from Sydney to a six-day fanfare of festivities in their honor, from receptions and parades to monetary awards and land grants. Central Bank has even been commissioned to mint a commemorative gold coin to honour their victory.

She earned an athletic scholarship to Southern University at New Orleans, but later transferred to Eastern Michigan University and then to Michigan State University.

She was forced to sit out the 1996 season because she was a transfer. She attended an indoor meet that year and stayed in a hotel room paid for by Michigan State. That being a violation, she lost her final season of eligibility in 1998, and her coach lost her job.

Personal bests

 100 metres: 10.91 seconds in Lausanne 1999 
 60 metres: 7.01 seconds in Maebashi 1999 
 50 metres: 6.05 seconds in Liévin 2000

Achievements

External links
 
 
 Bahamas Olympic Bio
 Michigan State
 Picture of Savatheda Fynes

1974 births
Living people
Bahamian female sprinters
Athletes (track and field) at the 1996 Summer Olympics
Athletes (track and field) at the 2000 Summer Olympics
Athletes (track and field) at the 2003 Pan American Games
Athletes (track and field) at the 2002 Commonwealth Games
Competitors at the 2006 Central American and Caribbean Games
Olympic athletes of the Bahamas
Olympic gold medalists for the Bahamas
Olympic silver medalists for the Bahamas
Pan American Games competitors for the Bahamas
Commonwealth Games gold medallists for the Bahamas
Commonwealth Games bronze medallists for the Bahamas
Michigan State Spartans women's track and field athletes
Southern Lady Jaguars track and field athletes
Commonwealth Games medallists in athletics
Eastern Michigan Eagles women's track and field athletes
World Athletics Championships medalists
Medalists at the 2000 Summer Olympics
Medalists at the 1996 Summer Olympics
Olympic gold medalists in athletics (track and field)
Olympic silver medalists in athletics (track and field)
Goodwill Games medalists in athletics
World Athletics Championships winners
Competitors at the 1998 Goodwill Games
Central American and Caribbean Games medalists in athletics
Olympic female sprinters
Medallists at the 2002 Commonwealth Games